Ronald Shelton  (October 1, 1961 – September 25, 2018), better known as The West Side Rapist, was an American convicted serial rapist. He was convicted of raping over 30 women in Cleveland, Ohio, over a 6-year period. He may have raped up to 50 women. Shelton was caught on video using an ATM with his victims' bank cards.

He was the subject of the book Unfinished Murder: The Pursuit of a Serial Rapist by James Neff.

Crimes
Shelton's modus operandi was to break into victims' homes wearing something to obscure his face. He would initially tell victims he was going to rob them, but then rape them. He would insist victims not look at him and threaten them if they reported him to police. His language and pattern of sexual assaults helped link his crimes.

Trial
Timothy J. McGinty prosecuted the case in 1989. He was found guilty of 220 charges, including 49 rapes of over 30 women in Cleveland, Ohio. Richard McMonagle sentenced him to between 1,554 and 3,195 years in prison. He received the longest sentence in Ohio's history.

Death

On September 25, 2018, at 4.30pm Shelton, aged 56, jumped from the top of a prison building, suffering a skull fracture upon impact with the concrete below. He was pronounced dead at 8:15 pm at nearby MetroHealth Medical Center. Investigators did not immediately suspect foul play.

References

1961 births
2018 suicides
20th-century American criminals
American rapists
American male criminals
American prisoners sentenced to life imprisonment
American people convicted of rape
Suicides by jumping in the United States
American people who died in prison custody
People who committed suicide in prison custody
Prisoners who died in Ohio detention
Suicides in Ohio